The 16th season of the television series Arthur was originally broadcast on PBS in the United States from October 15, 2012 until May 10, 2013 and consists of 10 episodes. This season was the first to be distributed by 9 Story Media Group, as Cookie Jar Entertainment merged with DHX Media. Season 16 was the first to be produced in 16:9 aspect ratio, in addition to switching from traditional animation to in-house Flash animation.

Episodes

Voice casting
The voice actors for Arthur, D.W., Brain, Timmy, and Catherine have all been replaced by new actors. Drew Adkins has replaced Dallas Jokic as Arthur, Jake Beale has replaced Robert Naylor as D.W., Siam Yu has replaced Lyle O'Donohoe as Brain, Jacob Ewaniuk has replaced Dakota Goyo as Timmy, and Robyn Thaler has replaced Alexina Cowan as Catherine. Beale previously voiced James in seasons 11 through 15.

This season was also the first one to feature two new characters, Ladonna Compson (Krystal Meadows) and Bud Compson (Julie Lemieux).

2012 American television seasons
2013 American television seasons
Arthur (TV series) seasons
2012 Canadian television seasons
2013 Canadian television seasons